Cornuticlava binaiae is a species of moth of the family Tortricidae first described by Józef Razowski in 2013. It is found on Seram Island in Indonesia.

The wingspan is about 22 mm. The ground colour of the forewings is white with indistinct brownish suffusions and brown spots along the costa and dorsum, as well as small brownish dots on the veins. The hindwings are white.

Etymology
The species name refers to Gunung Binaia, the type locality.

References

Moths described in 2013
Schoenotenini